Ivan Hristov (born 20 June 1977) is a football goalkeeper from Bulgaria currently playing for Bansko 1951 in the West B PFG.

External links
 

Living people
1977 births
Bulgarian footballers
PFC Lokomotiv Mezdra players
FC Bansko players
Association football goalkeepers